The 2021–22 Ligue 1 season, also known as Ligue 1 Uber Eats for sponsorship reasons, was a French association football tournament within Ligue 1. It was the 84th season since its establishment. It began on 6 August 2021 and concluded on 21 May 2022. The league fixtures were announced on 25 June 2021. Lille were the defending champions.

On 23 April, Paris Saint-Germain won a record-equalling tenth title with four matches to spare following a 1–1 draw against Lens.

Teams
A total of twenty teams participated in the 2021–22 edition of the Ligue 1.

Changes
Troyes (promoted after a three-year absence) and Clermont (promoted to Ligue 1 for the first time) were promoted from the 2020–21 Ligue 2. Dijon (relegated after five years in the top flight) and Nîmes (relegated after three years in the top flight) were relegated to 2021–22 Ligue 2.

Stadiums and locations

Number of teams by regions

Personnel and kits

Managerial changes

League table

Results

Relegation play-offs
The 2021–22 season ended with a relegation play-off between the 18th-placed Ligue 1 team, Saint-Étienne, and the winner of the semi-final of the Ligue 2 play-off, Auxerre, on a two-legged confrontation.

1st leg

2nd leg

2–2 on aggregate. Auxerre won 5–4 on penalties and were promoted to 2022–23 Ligue 1; Saint-Étienne were relegated to 2022–23 Ligue 2.

Season statistics

Top goalscorers

1 Delort played for Montpellier until matchday 3 and scored 2 goals.
2 Laborde played for Montpellier until matchday 4 and scored 3 goals.

Clean sheets

Hat-tricks

Discipline

Player
 Most yellow cards: 12
 Marco Verratti (Paris Saint-Germain)
 Most red cards: 3
 Dante (Nice)

Team
 Most yellow cards: 93
Lille
 Most red cards: 9
Metz
Montpellier
 Fewest yellow cards: 54
Rennes
 Fewest red cards: 2
Brest
Rennes

Awards

Monthly

Annual

References

External links

Ligue 1 seasons
1
France